The following games were initially announced as PlayStation 4 titles, but were subsequently cancelled or postponed indefinitely by developers or publishers.

References

4

PlayStation 4